The Lamar Building is a 17-story skyscraper in Augusta, Georgia. It was scheduled to be completed in 1916, but the Augusta Fire of 1916 forced crews to demolish the building and restart. It was finally completed in 1918. A penthouse level was added in 1976, designed by I. M. Pei. In July 2011, the architectural critic James Howard Kunstler labeled it his "Eyesore of the Month", saying the addition is reminiscent of a Darth Vader helmet.

Pei's addition presaged the glass pyramid he designed for The Louvre in Paris.

The building was placed on the National Register of Historic Places in 1979. Fire insurance maps indicate a height of 165' (50 m) to the top of the roof at the 16th floor, just beneath the penthouse addition.

It has been the tallest building in Augusta ever since it was built. The Marion Building stands next to the Lamar Building and has been called its "sister building".

The Lamar Building was added to the National Register of Historic Places in 1979.

Restoration Efforts 
After sitting vacant for many years, the building was sold in June 2021 to Albany, GA based developer Pace Burt.

Burt, who has worked on multiple other historic renovation projects in the Southeast, has released plans for the building to be converted into a high-end multi-family development with just under 70 units.

References

External links 

Buildings and structures in Augusta, Georgia
G. Lloyd Preacher buildings
National Register of Historic Places in Augusta, Georgia
Skyscrapers in Georgia (U.S. state)
Skyscraper office buildings in Georgia (U.S. state)